Léopard Sportif de Douala or simply Léopard Douala is a Cameroonian football club based in Douala.

In 1972, with a squad including Roger Milla, the team won the Cameroon Première Division.

Achievements
 Cameroon Première Division: 3
 1972, 1973, 1974

Stadium
Currently the team plays at the Stade de la Réunification.

See also
1973 Cameroonian Premier League

References

External links 
Foot-base
Fr.Wikipedia

Football clubs in Cameroon
Sports clubs in Cameroon
Sport in Douala